Lassen County is a county in the northeastern portion of the U.S. state of California. As of the 2020 census, the population was 32,730. The county seat and only incorporated city is Susanville. Lassen County comprises the Susanville, California, micropolitan statistical area. A former farming, mining and lumber area, its economy now depends on employment at one federal and two state prisons; the former in Herlong and the latter two in Susanville. In 2007, half the adults in Susanville worked in one of the facilities.

History
Lassen County was formed on April 1, 1864, from parts of Plumas and Shasta counties following the two-day conflict known as the Sagebrush War, also called the Roop County War, that started on February 15, 1863. Due to uncertainties over the California border, the area that is now Lassen County was part of the unofficial Nataqua Territory and Roop County, Nevada, during the late 1850s and early 1860s.

The county was named by California after Peter Lassen, along with Lassen Peak, which is in adjoining Shasta County. Lassen was one of General John C. Fremont's guides, and a famous trapper, frontiersman, and Indian fighter. He was murdered under mysterious circumstances near the Black Rock Desert in 1859, and his murder was never solved.

By the 1880s small towns began to spring up all over Lassen County. Bieber developed at the north end of the county, in rich farm land. Gold was discovered at Hayden Hill, and the small town developed to support the miners. Hayden Hill no longer exists: when the mining stopped, the townspeople left for other communities. Madeline was formed at the north end of another rich farming valley, and along the railroad tracks heading north to Alturas, California. This community still has about 50 people living in and around the town. In the 1890s many immigrant family groups arrived in the county, primarily coming from Lincolnshire and Herefordshire, England as well as the towns of Belgrade, Novi Sad, Niš and Kragujevac in Serbia. Several "Yankee" settlers arrived from Waldo County, Maine and Lincoln County, Maine as well.

During World War I, the area was heavily in favor of American entry into the war, and a disproportionate amount of volunteers from Lassen County signed up to take part in the war effort. A pro-German newspaper editor from San Francisco noted that "the inhabitants of Lassen County" were "sympathetic to Britain, hostile to Germany, and indifferent to France."

A narrow gauge railroad, the Nevada-California-Oregon Railway, ran through Lassen County from 1880 to 1927. The NCOR was the longest small gauge of the century. It was intended to connect Reno, Nevada, to the Columbia River, but only  of track were laid, from Reno to Lakeview, Oregon.

In 1913, the Fernley & Lassen Railroad was built and it was used to export timber from the large forests of Lassen County. As this railroad was completed, the Red River Lumber Company set up shop, building the town of Westwood, California, to support its massive logging operation.  Two other lumber mills followed the Red River Lumber Co. They built their mills in the county seat of Susanville. The Lassen Lumber and Box Company and the Fruit Growers Company both operated mills in Susanville for several decades.

In 2003, Anderson-based Sierra Pacific Industries announced plans to relocate or lay off 150 workers as they closed the last lumber mill in Susanville due to the lack of large timber for the mill.  Sierra Pacific chose to close the mill permanently rather than spend the several million dollars required to convert the mill from large to small timber.

Since the late 20th century, three prisons have been opened in and near Susanville: California Correctional Center (minimum security, 1963) and High Desert State Prison (California) (maximum security, 1995), both in the city; and the nearby Federal Correctional Institution, Herlong (opened 2007). In 2007, half the adults in Susanville worked in one of the three prisons. In "job-starved rural America, ... residents see them [prisons] as the last and only chance for employment after work at the lumber mill or the dairy dries up."

Education
Lassen County is served by Lassen Community College, Lassen High School District, Mt. Lassen Charter School, Thompson Peak Charter School, Diamond Mountain Charter High, Diamond Mountain Middle School, Herlong High School, Long Valley Charter School, Fort Sage Charter School, and Westwood Junior Senior High School.

Geography

Part of Lassen Volcanic National Park extends onto a western corner of the county.

Adjacent counties
Modoc County, California - north
Washoe County, Nevada - east
Sierra County, California - southeast
Plumas County, California - south
Shasta County, California - west

National protected areas
 Lassen National Forest (part)
 Lassen Volcanic National Park (part)
 Modoc National Forest (part)
 Plumas National Forest (part)
 Toiyabe National Forest (part)

Demographics

2011

Places by population, race, and income

2010

The 2010 United States Census reported that Lassen County had a population of 34,895. The racial makeup of Lassen County was 25,532 (73.2%) White, 2,834 (8.1%) African American, 1,234 (3.5%) Native American, 356 (1.0%) Asian, 165 (0.5%) Pacific Islander, 3,562 (10.2%) from other races, and 1,212 (3.5%) from two or more races.  Hispanic or Latino of any race were 6,117 persons (17.5%).

2000
As of the census of 2000, there were 33,828 people, 9,625 households, and 6,776 families residing in the county. The population density was 7 people per square mile (3/km2). There were 12,000 housing units at an average density of 3 per square mile (1/km2). The racial makeup of the county was 80.8% White, 8.8% Black or African American, 3.3% Native American, 0.7% Asian, 0.4% Pacific Islander, 3.2% from other races, and 2.7% from two or more races. 13.8% of the population were Hispanic or Latino of any race. 13.8% were of German, 12.1% Irish, 10.5% English, 8.7% American and 5.0% Italian ancestry according to Census 2000. 88.2% spoke English and 10.3% Spanish as their first language.

There were 9,625 households, out of which 35.9% had children under the age of 18 living with them, 55.8% were married couples living together, 10.3% had a female householder with no husband present, and 29.6% were non-families. Of all households, 24.5% were made up of individuals, and 9.2% had someone living alone who was 65 years of age or older. The average household size was 2.59 and the average family size was 3.08.

In the county, the population was spread out, with 21.8% under the age of 18, 10.8% from 18 to 24, 36.9% from 25 to 44, 21.4% from 45 to 64, and 9.0% who were 65 years of age or older. The median age was 35 years. For every 100 females there were 168.8 males. For every 100 females age 18 and over, there were 192.2 males.

The median income for a household in the county was $36,310, and the median income for a family was $43,398. Males had a median income of $37,333 versus $26,561 for females. The per capita income for the county was $14,749. About 11.1% of families and 14.0% of the population were below the poverty line, including 16.1% of those under age 18 and 7.8% of those age 65 or over.

Politics

Voter registration

Cities by population and voter registration

Overview 
From 1932 through 1976, Lassen was powerfully Democratic, voting for the Democratic presidential nominee in every election save 1972, when it voted for Nixon over McGovern by just 6.8%. From 1980 on, however, it has been overwhelmingly Republican in presidential and congressional elections; Jimmy Carter (in 1976) remains the last Democrat to have carried the county. In both 2016 and 2020, Lassen stood as Donald Trump's best county in the state, giving him a 50% or greater margin over overwhelming statewide winners Hillary Clinton and Joe Biden.

  
  
  
  
  
  
  
  
  
  
  
  
  
  
  
  
  
  
  
  
  
  
  
  
  
  
  
  
  
  
  

Crime 

The following table includes the number of incidents reported and the rate per 1,000 persons for each type of offense.

Cities by population and crime rates

Infrastructure

Airports
Susanville Municipal Airport, Herlong Airport and Westwood Airport are general aviation airports in the county.

Major highways
 U.S. Route 395
 State Route 36
 State Route 44
 State Route 139
 State Route 299

Public transportation
Lassen Rural Bus (LRB), operated by the Lassen Transit Service Agency, runs a local service in Susanville, and longer distance routes to Westwood and Doyle.

Utilities
The Lassen Municipal Utility District (LMUD) is the primary electric utility in the county, and was created in 1986 by purchasing transmission facilities from CP National (now Pacificorp) at a cost of $19 million. In 2019 it had 42 employees, and the General Manager was Doug C. Smith. It is powered in part by the Honey Lake biomass power plant, which runs on wood waste from the nearby Lassen National Forest. The Whaleback Fire caused a significant outage in 2018.

Communities

City
Susanville (county seat)

Census-designated places

Bieber
Clear Creek
Doyle
Herlong
Janesville
Johnstonville
Litchfield
Little Valley
Madeline
Milford
Nubieber
Patton Village
Spaulding
Stones Landing
Westwood

Unincorporated communities
Ravendale
Standish
Termo
Wendel

Population ranking
The population ranking of the following table is based on the 2020 census of Lassen County.

† county seat

See also 
National Register of Historic Places listings in Lassen County, California

Notes

References

External links

 
 Lassen County Times newspaper
 Lassen County History and Culture

 
1864 establishments in California
California counties
Populated places established in 1864
Shasta Cascade